(1513–1555) was a Japanese daimyō of the Sengoku period, who ruled a region in Higo Province. He was adopted to Sagara Yoshishige and became the head of the Sagara clan.

References 

1513 births
1555 deaths
Daimyo
Sagara clan